Hubert Erang (4 March 1931 – 4 July 2022) was a Luxembourgian gymnast. He competed at the 1952 Summer Olympics and the 1960 Summer Olympics.

References

External links

1931 births
2022 deaths
Luxembourgian male artistic gymnasts
Olympic gymnasts of Luxembourg
Gymnasts at the 1952 Summer Olympics
Gymnasts at the 1960 Summer Olympics
Sportspeople from Esch-sur-Alzette
20th-century Luxembourgian people